Henry Page (June 28, 1841 – January 7, 1913) was an American politician.

Biography
Page was born in Princess Anne, Maryland, and received preparatory instruction at the school of Anthony Bolivar in West Chester, Pennsylvania. He attended the University of Virginia at Charlottesville where he studied law.  He was admitted to the bar in 1864 and commenced practice in Princess Anne.

Page's early political career included service as a member of the constitutional convention in 1867, and as State's attorney for Somerset County, Maryland, from 1870 to 1884. He was elected as a Democrat to the Fifty-second Congress and served from March 4, 1891, until September 3, 1892, when he resigned to become a judge of the Maryland Court of Appeals. He was appointed chief judge of the first judicial district of Maryland in August 1892, and was elected to the position in November 1893 for a term of fifteen years. He died in Princess Anne in 1913, and is interred in Manokin Presbyterian Church Cemetery.

References

External links

1841 births
1913 deaths
Judges of the Maryland Court of Appeals
People from Princess Anne, Maryland
Democratic Party members of the United States House of Representatives from Maryland
19th-century American politicians
19th-century American judges